D19 may refer to:

Ships 
 , a Cannon-class destroyer escort of the Brazilian Navy
 , a County-class destroyer of the Royal Navy
 , a Admiralty type destroyer of the Royal Navy
 , a Ruler-class escort carrier of the Royal Navy
 , a Q-class destroyer of the Royal Navy

Other uses 
 D-19 (Michigan county highway)
 D-19 launch system for Soviet and later Russian R-39 missiles
 Allis-Chalmers D19, an American tractor
 Dewoitine D.19, a French fighter aircraft
 GSR Class D19, an Irish steam locomotive
 LNER Class D19, an English steam locomotive class